Nærbø Church is a parish church of the Church of Norway in Hå Municipality in Rogaland county, Norway. It is located in the village of Nærbø. It is the main church for the Nærbø parish which is part of the Jæren prosti (deanery) in the Diocese of Stavanger. 

The stone and glass church was built in a fan-shaped style in 2005 using designs by the architect Gunnar Fossen from the firm Brandsberg-Dahls Arkitektkontor AS. The church seats about 500 people.

This church was built in 2005 to replace the Old Nærbø Church which was nearly 200 years old and too small for the community.

Media gallery

See also
List of churches in Rogaland

References

Hå
Churches in Rogaland
21st-century Church of Norway church buildings
Churches completed in 2005
2005 establishments in Norway